Eston Mulenga (7 August 1967 – 27 April 1993) was a Zambian footballer and member of the national team.  He was among those killed in the crash of the team plane in Gabon in 1993.

Career
Mulenga played club football for Nkana F.C. in Zambia.

Mulenga made several appearances for the Zambia national football team and participated in the 1990 and 1992 African Cup of Nations finals. He also played for Zambia at the 1988 Summer Olympics in Seoul.

References

External links

1967 births
1993 deaths
Zambian footballers
Zambia international footballers
Victims of aviation accidents or incidents in Gabon
Footballers at the 1988 Summer Olympics
Olympic footballers of Zambia
1990 African Cup of Nations players
1992 African Cup of Nations players
Nkana F.C. players
Association football defenders
Footballers killed in the 1993 Zambia national football team plane crash